Sunset Point is a summer village in Alberta, Canada. It is located on the eastern shore of Lac Ste. Anne and north of Alberta Beach.

Demographics 

In the 2016 Census of Population conducted by Statistics Canada, the Summer Village of Sunset Point had a population of 169 living in 74 of its 337 total private dwellings, a  change from its 2011 population of 221.

See also 
List of communities in Alberta
List of summer villages in Alberta
List of resort villages in Saskatchewan

References

External links 

1959 establishments in Alberta
Lac Ste. Anne County
Summer villages in Alberta